Júnior Osmar Ignacio Alonso Mujica (born 9 February 1993) is a Paraguayan footballer who plays either as a centre back or a left back for Russian Premier League club Krasnodar and the Paraguay national team.

Club career

Lille
Alonso joined French club Lille in a permanent transfer in January 2017. He made his debut for the club on 18 February 2017, coming on as a second-half substitute in a win over SM Caen. He would go on to make 56 appearances for Lille in all competitions before leaving on loan in August 2018.

Celta (loan)
On 14 August 2018, Alonso was loaned to La Liga's Celta Vigo for one year with an option to make the deal permanent.

Boca Juniors (loan)
On 2 January 2019, he was loaned to Boca Juniors. On 2 May 2019, Alonso was an unused substitute as Boca defeated Rosario Central in the 2018 Supercopa Argentina on penalty-kicks after the match ended 0–0.

Atlético Mineiro
On 2 July 2020, Alonso joined Brazilian club Atlético Mineiro on a four-year deal for a €3 million fee.

Krasnodar
On 7 January 2022, Russian club Krasnodar announced that the terms of transfer has been agreed with Atlético Mineiro, and the terms of the 3.5-year contract has been agreed with Alonso. The contract was signed on 12 January 2022. On 3 March 2022, following the Russian invasion of Ukraine, Krasnodar announced that his contract is suspended and he will not train with the team, but the contract is not terminated and remains valid.

Return to Atlético Mineiro (loan)
On 14 March 2022, Atlético Mineiro announced the return of Alonso on loan until the end of 2022.

International career 
Alonso is a full international for Paraguay, having made his senior debut for his country in 2013.

In a 2018 FIFA World Cup qualifying match on 23 March 2017, Alonso scored the winning goal, and his first for the national team, in a 2–1 defeat of Ecuador.

On 29 May 2019, Alonso was selected to the final 23-man roster for the 2019 Copa América in Brazil. He would go on to start in all four of Paraguay's matches, playing every single minute, as they lost in the quarter-finals in a penalty shoot-out to hosts and eventual champions Brazil.

Career statistics

Club

International 

Scores and results list Paraguay's goal tally first.

Honours

Club 
Cerro Porteño
Paraguayan Primera División: 2013 Clausura, 2015 Apertura

Boca Juniors
Argentine Primera División: 2019–20
Supercopa Argentina: 2018

Atlético Mineiro
Campeonato Brasileiro Série A: 2021
Copa do Brasil: 2021
Campeonato Mineiro: 2020, 2021, 2022

Individual 
Bola de Prata: 2020, 2021
Campeonato Brasileiro Série A Team of the Year: 2021
South American Team of the Year: 2021

References

External links

 
 
 

1993 births
Living people
Paraguayan footballers
Paraguayan expatriate footballers
Paraguay under-20 international footballers
Paraguay international footballers
Association football defenders
Sportspeople from Asunción
Paraguayan Primera División players
Ligue 1 players
La Liga players
Argentine Primera División players
Campeonato Brasileiro Série A players
Russian Premier League players
Cerro Porteño players
Lille OSC players
RC Celta de Vigo players
Boca Juniors footballers
Clube Atlético Mineiro players
FC Krasnodar players
2019 Copa América players
2021 Copa América players
Paraguayan expatriate sportspeople in Argentina
Paraguayan expatriate sportspeople in Brazil
Paraguayan expatriate sportspeople in France
Paraguayan expatriate sportspeople in Spain
Paraguayan expatriate sportspeople in Russia
Expatriate footballers in Argentina
Expatriate footballers in Brazil
Expatriate footballers in France
Expatriate footballers in Spain
Expatriate footballers in Russia